Whitehead is a surname. Recorded in a number of spellings including Whithead, Whitehed, Whithed, and Whitsed, this surname is of English origins. It usually derives from the Old English pre–7th century word "hwit" meaning white, plus "heafod", a head, combined to form a descriptive nickname for someone with white hair.

Notable people with the surname include:

 Adam Whitehead (born 1980), British swimmer
 Adrian Whitehead (born 1975), Australian rules footballer
 Agathe Whitehead (1891–1922), British heiress, wife of Georg von Trapp
 Alan Whitehead (disambiguation), multiple people
 Alfred North Whitehead (1861–1947), British philosopher and mathematician
 Alfred Whitehead (1887–1974), English composer, organist, choirmaster and music educator, active in Canada
 Mrs. Andrew Whitehead (died 1920), American blizzard victim
 Annie Whitehead (born 1955), English jazz trombone player
 Axle Whitehead (born 1980), Australian entertainer
 Barb Whitehead (born 1961), American golfer
 Ben Whitehead (born 1977), English voice actor
 Bob Whitehead (born 1953), American game designer and programmer
 Bob Whitehead (20th century), American soccer player
 Bruce Whitehead, American politician in Colorado
 Bud Whitehead (born 1939), American football player
 Bus Whitehead (1928–2010), American basketball player
 Burgess Whitehead (1910–1993), American baseball player
 Charles Whitehead (1804–1862), English poet, novelist and dramatist
 Charlie Whitehead (1899-1972), Australian rules footballer
 Chris Whitehead (born 1986), English rugby union player
 Christian Whitehead, Australian video game developer
 Chryssie Whitehead American actress, singer and dancer
 Cindy Whitehead (born 1962), American skateboarder
 Clay T. Whitehead (1938–2008), United States government official in charge of telecommunications
 Clive Whitehead (born 1955), English footballer - Bristol City and West Bromwich Albion
 Colson Whitehead (born 1969), American author
 David Whitehead (disambiguation), multiple people
 Dean Whitehead (born 1982), English footballer
 Derek Whitehead (born 1944), English rugby league footballer
 Don Whitehead (1908–1981), American journalist
 Donald R. Whitehead (1938–1990), American entomologist
 Donald S. Whitehead (1888-1957), American politician from Idaho
 Edward Whitehead (1908–1978), spokesman and later president of Schweppes
 Edgar Whitehead (1905–1971), Rhodesian politician
 Elliott Whitehead (born 1989), English rugby league player
 Emily Whitehead (born 2000), Australian artistic gymnast
 Ennis Whitehead (1895–1964), Lieutenant General U.S. Air Force
 Fionn Whitehead (born 1996/1997), English actor
 Frank Whitehead (Canadian politician), Canadian politician
 Frank Whitehead (mayor) (1892–1976), American politician from Florida
 Frederick Whitehead, (1853–1938), English landscape artist and illustrator
 Frederick Wilson Whitehead, (1863–1926), English organist, composer and music teacher
 Gary Whitehead (born 1965), American poet and painter
 Geoffrey Whitehead (born 1939), English actor
 Geoffrey Whitehead (ABC), Australian business executive
 George Whitehead (disambiguation), multiple people
 Gillian Whitehead (born 1941), New Zealand composer
 Graham Whitehead (1922–1981), British racing driver
 Gregory Whitehead, American writer, radiomaker and audio artist
 Gustave Whitehead (1874–1927), aviation pioneer, emigrated from Germany to U.S., claims to make first powered airplane flight in 1901 not accepted by mainstream aviation historians
 Hal Whitehead, Canadian biologist
 Henry Whitehead (disambiguation), multiple people
 Hugh Whitehead (died 1551), prior of the Benedictine monastery at Durham, England
 Ian Whitehead (born 1946), Scottish footballer and manager
 J. Gordon Whitehead, contributed to the death of Houdini
 J. H. C. Whitehead (1904–1960) (known as Henry), British mathematician
 Jamal Whitehead, American lawyer
 James Whitehead (disambiguation) (including Jim and Jimmy), multiple people
 Jason John Whitehead, Canadian stand-up comedian, active in Britain
 Jay Whitehead (born 1959), American author and publisher
 Jef "Wrest" Whitehead (born 1989), American Metal Musician & Tattoo artist
 Jennifer Whitehead (born 1977), American volleyball player and coach
 Jermaine Whitehead (born 1993), American football player
 Jerome Whitehead (1956–2012), American basketball player
 John Whitehead (disambiguation), multiple people
 Jonathan Whitehead (1960–2020), English composer
 Jordan Whitehead (born 1997), American football player
 Joseph Whitehead (disambiguation), multiple people
 Lees Whitehead (1864–1913), English cricketer
 Lucky Whitehead (born 1992), American football player
 Luke Whitehead (born 1981), American basketball player
 Luther Whitehead (1869–1931), English cricketer
 Martha Whitehead, Texas State Treasurer
 Max Whitehead (1923–2010), Australian rugby league footballer
 Maxey Whitehead (born 1985), American voice actress
 Mike Whitehead (born 1981), American mixed martial arts fighter
 Milt Whitehead (1862–1901), Canadian baseball player
 Neville Whitehead (bassist), New Zealand jazz bassist and luthier
 Nick Whitehead (1933–2002), Welsh sprinter
 Nikki Whitehead (1975–2010), American mother murdered by her twin daughters Jasmiyah and Tasmiyah
 Nicole Whitehead (born 1980), American model and Playboy Playmate
 Norman Whitehead (1915–1983, English landscape painter
 O.Z. Whitehead (1911–1998), American actor and author
 Paul Whitehead, British painter and graphic artist
 Paxton Whitehead (born 1937), British actor
 Peter Whitehead (disambiguation), multiple people
 Phil Whitehead (born 1969), English footballer
 Phillip Whitehead (1937–2005), British politician, television producer and writer
 R. Whitehead (cricketer), English cricketer between 1785 and 1800
 Ralph Radcliffe Whitehead (1854–1929), founder of the Byrdcliffe Arts and Crafts Colony, New York
 Rex Whitehead (born 1948), Australian cricket umpire
 Richard Whitehead (disambiguation), multiple people
 Richmal Oates-Whitehead (1970–2005), New Zealander who died in London
 Robert Whitehead (disambiguation), multiple people
 Ron Whitehead, American poet
 Rowland Whitehead (disambiguation), multiple people 
 Stanley Whitehead (1911–1976), New Zealand politician
 Stanley Whitehead (physicist) (1902–1956), British physicist
 Steve Whitehead (born 1960), English photorealist painter
 Stuart Whitehead (born 1976), English footballer
 Tahir Whitehead (born 1990), American football player
 Terrell Whitehead (born 1988), American football player
 Terrence Whitehead (born 1983), American football player
 Thomas Whitehead (disambiguation), multiple people
 Þór Whitehead (Thor Whitehead) (born 1943), Icelandic historian
 Thora Whitehead (1936–2021), Australian shell collector and malacologist
 Tim Whitehead (born 1961), American ice hockey coach
 Tim Whitehead (born 1988), South African rugby union player
 William Whitehead (disambiguation) (including Willie), multiple people
 Walter Whitehead (1840–1913), English surgeon

See also

Whitehead baronets
Whitehead (disambiguation)
Weißhaupt, surname
Weißkopf, surname

References

English-language surnames